The Big Rich: The Rise and Fall of the Greatest Texas Oil Fortunes is the fifth book by Bryan Burrough, published in 2009. The book tells the story of four Texas oil men and their families that made large fortunes in the oil industry: Hugh Roy Cullen, Clint Murchison, Sid Richardson and H.L. Hunt.

References

External links
After Words interview with Burrough on The Big Rich, February 7, 2009

American non-fiction books
2009 non-fiction books
History of the petroleum industry in the United States
History of Texas